Zbyněk Irgl (born November 29, 1980) is a Czech professional ice hockey player currently with HC Olomouc of the Czech Extraliga.

Irgl was selected 197th overall by the Nashville Predators in round 6 of the 2000 NHL Entry Draft. The Predators had received the pick from the St. Louis Blues in a trade for Blair Atcheynum. The selection meant little for the Predators as Irgl has played his entire professional career in Europe, first in the Czech Extraliga for HC Vítkovice, in 2007-2010 for Lokomotiv Yaroslavl of the KHL. In 2010-11 Irgl Zbyněk played for Atlant Moscow Oblast  of the KHL.

International play
Irgl played his first game for the national team in 2004, and has played 52 times for the Czech national team (as of January 3, 2009.)

Career statistics

Regular season and playoffs

International

References

External links

1980 births
Czech ice hockey left wingers
HC Dukla Jihlava players
HC Havířov players
HC Slezan Opava players
HC Vítkovice players
HC Oceláři Třinec players
HC Olomouc players
Czech expatriate ice hockey players in Russia
Atlant Moscow Oblast players
HC Dinamo Minsk players
Living people
Lokomotiv Yaroslavl players
HC Davos players
Nashville Predators draft picks
Sportspeople from Ostrava
Czech expatriate ice hockey players in Switzerland
Czech expatriate sportspeople in Belarus
Expatriate ice hockey players in Belarus